The President Street–Medgar Evers College station (originally President Street station) is a station on the IRT Nostrand Avenue Line of the New York City Subway. Located at the intersection of President Street and Nostrand Avenue in Brooklyn, the station is served by the 2 train at all times and the 5 train on weekdays.

History 

The Dual Contracts, which were signed on March 19, 1913, were contracts for the construction and/or rehabilitation and operation of rapid transit lines in the City of New York. The Dual Contracts promised the construction of several lines in Brooklyn. As part of Contract 3, the IRT agreed to build a subway line along Nostrand Avenue in Brooklyn. The construction of the subway along Nostrand Avenue spurred real estate development in the surrounding areas. The Nostrand Avenue Line opened on August 23, 1920, and the President Street station opened along with it.

During the 1950s the platform was lengthened at its southern end to be able to accommodate 10-car trains which are 514 feet (157 m) long.

President Street, along with the Franklin Avenue station on the IRT Eastern Parkway Line, are the two closest stations to the City University of New York's Medgar Evers College. In 2019, a bill to add the college's name to both stations' names was passed in the New York state legislature and signed into law. The name of the President Street station was officially changed to President Street–Medgar Evers College on October 1, 2020, both to reflect the station's proximity to the college and to honor the college's namesake, civil rights figure Medgar Evers.

Station layout 

This deep underground station is the northernmost on the IRT Nostrand Avenue Line and the only one that has one island platform and two tracks. All stations to the south are set up as two track and two side platforms. To the north, the IRT Nostrand Avenue Line curves west and joins the local tracks of the IRT Eastern Parkway Line, where there are crossovers to the express tracks in an interlocking called Rogers Junction. The Nostrand Avenue station on that line is just two blocks north.

This station's platform has wide I-beam columns painted in blue on both sides at regular intervals with alternating ones having the standard black station name plate with white lettering. The track walls have their original Dual Contracts trim line with "P" tablets on it at regular intervals for "President." Towards the south end of the station, where the platform was extended in the 1950s to accommodate the current standard IRT train length of 510 feet (160 m), the walls have "PRESIDENT ST" in white sans serif font on a blue border.

Exits
The station's only entrance/exit is near the north end of the platform. A single double-flight staircase and up-only escalator go up three stories to a small waiting area, where a turnstile bank provides entrance/exit from the system. Outside fare control, there is a token booth and two street stairs going up to both northern corners of President Street and Nostrand Avenue.

References

External links 

 

IRT Nostrand Avenue Line stations
New York City Subway stations in Brooklyn
Railway stations in the United States opened in 1920
1920 establishments in New York City
Flatbush, Brooklyn
Crown Heights, Brooklyn
New York City Subway stations at university and college campuses